Ceratopyxis is a monotypic genus of flowering plants in the family Rubiaceae. The genus contains only one species, viz. Ceratopyxis verbenaceae, which is endemic to Cuba. It is a resinous small tree or bush with 4.5-8 centimeter oblong leaves. The fruit it produces is 4-5 millimeters in diameter, and with small hairs attached to the skin.

References

External links 
 Ceratopyxis in the World Checklist of Rubiaceae

Monotypic Rubiaceae genera
Chiococceae
Taxa named by Joseph Dalton Hooker